Mila D. Aguilar (born 1949) is a Filipina poet, revolutionary, essayist, teacher, video documentarian, and website designer. She wrote the poetry books A Comrade is as Precious as a Rice Seedling and Journey: An Autobiography in Verse (1964-1995).

As a poet, she has written about 400 poems in English, Filipino, and Ilonggo, about 125 of which are in Journey: An Autobiography in Verse (1964-1995), a collection published by the University of the Philippines Press in 1996. The poems in this collection were culled from six books printed in Manila, San Francisco, and New York City between the years 1974 and 1987 (including A Comrade is as Precious as a Rice Seedling), as well as from her writing in subsequent years up to 1995. Chronicle of a Life Foretold: 101 Poems (1995-2005) was published in 2012 by Popular Bookstore, and two more collections Poetry as Prophecy (2005-2013), and an untitled book, remain unpublished.

Biography
In 1971, Aguilar went underground, disagreeing with the policies of the Philippine government; she was arrested in 1984.

Aguilar has also written more than a hundred essays. A handful of these were done when she went "underground", first as an ordinary member, later as head of the Regional United Front Commission of Mindanao, and finally as head of the National United Front Commission of the Communist Party of the Philippines, the rebel organization from which she resigned in 1984.

She has produced, written, and directed almost 50 videos on subjects ranging from community organizations to regional cultures and good manners for government employees.

As a "webweaver", a term she invented, she has designed her own web pages as well as the website of a non-governmental organization.

She taught at the Department of English and Comparative Literature of the University of the Philippines, Diliman from 1969-1971, and again from 2000-2006.

She also taught at St Joseph's College after her release from prison in 1986.

Her full autobiography is entitled The Nine Deaths of M. It is a Kindle book and can be downloaded on Amazon.

References

 Josephine Bass Serrano, Trinidad Maño Ames, A Survey of Filipino Literature in English, Phoenix Publishing House, 1988
 Philippine Studies, Ateneo de Manila University Press, 2005
 Zapanta-Manlapaz, Filipino Women Writers in English: Their Story, 1905-2002, Ateneo de Manila University Press, 2003
 Wall Tappings: An International Anthology of Women’s Prison Writings, 200 to the Present. 2nd ed. Judith A. Scheffler, ed. New York: The Feminist Press at the City University of New York, 2002. (“Haikus in Solitary Confinement,” “Prison,” “As the Dust,” “Lizard in Bicutan,” “Pigeons for my Son,” “Freed Pigeon I Shall Be,” pp 22–27, with introduction to the poet.)
 Cultural Center of the Philippines'''' Encyclopedia of the Arts
 Dare to Struggle, Dare to Win! (Manila 1974) using nom de guerre Clarita Roja
 The Mass Line (A Second Remoulding) (Manila 1977) using nom de guerre Clarita Roja
 Why Cage Pigeons? (Manila 1984)
 Pall Hanging over Manila (San Francisco 1984)
 A Comrade is as Precious as a Rice Seedling (New York 1984, 1985 and 1987; also in Braille, Womyn’s Series)
 Journey: An Autobiography in Verse (1964-1995) (U of the Philippines Press 1996)
 Chronicle of a Life Foretold: 110 Poems (1995-2004) (Popular Bookstore)
 The Nine Deaths of M (Kindle 2013)

External links
 http://mda.ph

1949 births
Living people
Filipino writers
Filipino women writers
Academic staff of the University of the Philippines